Op den Graeff, also Updegraff, Uptegraft, Updegraft, Updegrave, Updegrove, Uptegrove, Ubdegrove, Uptegraph is a Dutch and American family.

History 
The earliest historically proven Op den Graeff, Herman op den Graeff (1585-1642) lived in Aldekerk (Kleve), near the border to the modern Netherlands. Some believe that Duke John William, Duke of Jülich-Cleves-Berg had a morganatic marriage prior to 1585 with Anna op den Graeff (van de Aldekerk), with whom he had Herman. No substantial evidence of any relation between the Op den Graeff and John William, Duke of Jülich-Cleves-Berg has ever been presented, so most likely that connection is non-existent.

During the 17th century the Op den Graeffs were a family of linen weavers in Krefeld and continued this occupation later in Germantown, although the family purchased jointly 2,000 acres of land in Germantown. In Krefeld the family belong to the Mennonite circle, which turned Quaker in part ca. 1679-1680. In the end of the 17th century some of the Op den Graeff descendants migrated to the United States. They are among the thirteen families (Original 13) often referred to as the Germantown, Philadelphia, Pennsylvania Founders, who arrived on the ship Concord on October 6, 1683. One of these was famous Abraham op den Graeff, a cousin of William Penn, who signed along with three others the first organized religious petition against slavery in the colonies, the 1688 Germantown Quaker Petition Against Slavery.

Abraham op den Graeffs descendants are named Opdegraf(f), Updegraf(f), Uptagraff(t), Updegrave, Updegrove, Updegraph, Uptegraph, Upthegrove and Ubdegrove. Pennsylvania Governor Samuel Whitaker Pennypacker was the fourth great-grandson of Abraham. Some of their descendants continued in or returned to the Mennonite faith and were found in the Montgomery County congregations of Skippack and Boyertown until modern times.

During the earlier 19th century David Benjamin Updegraff of the Updegraff branch of the family was a conductor (one of the leaders) of the Underground Railroad. He was one of the first outspoken anti-slavery men, and voted with the first liberty party from conscientious convictions. His house was the home of antislavery advocates and temperance lecturers also a station on the Underground Railroad.

Notable family members 
 Herman op den Graeff (1585–1642), Mennonite community leader 
 Abraham op den Graeff (1649–1731), one of the "Original 13", politician, signer of the first organized religious protest against slavery
 Nathan Updegraff (1750–1827), a founder and delegate to Ohio's first constitutional convention
 David Benjamin Updegraff (1789–1864), conductor of the Underground Railroad, minister of Friends church
 Jonathan T. Updegraff (1822–1882), U.S. Representative from Ohio
 David Brainard Updegraff (1830–1894), minister of Friends church (Quaker minister)
 Thomas Updegraff (1834–1910), attorney and five-term Republican member of the U.S. House of Representatives from northeastern Iowa 
 Laura Upthegrove (1896–1927), American bandit known as "The Queen of the Everglades"
 Ed Updegraff (1922–2022), American amateur golfer and urologist
 Mark K. Updegrove (born 1961), American author and historian, director of the Lyndon Baines Johnson Library and Museum 
 Stephen Updegraff (born 1962), American refractive surgeon
 Dave Upthegrove, American politician
 Dewitt Upthegrove, American businessman and politician
 William Hendry Upthegrove American army captain

see also:
 Wieman v. Updegraff

Connection with William Penn 
The Op den Graeff family is sometimes said to be related to William Penn, the founder and gouverneur of Pennsylvania. The sources in support of this view cited above, are derivative sources, relying on derivative sources, and hence not reliable.  Whether the original source documentation is sufficient to justify these claims is unknown.

lineage:

 Driessen Pletjes (1550–1645) ≈ Alet Goebels
 Alet Pletjes (1583-?) ≈ (Sir ?) John Jasper
 Margaret Jasper (c 1624-1682), 1st ≈ Nicasius Van der Schure; 2nd ≈ admiral Sir William Penn (1621–1670)
 gouverneur William Penn (1644–1718)
 Ann Jasper (born c 1628) ≈ William Crispin (1627–1681)
 Greitgen Pletjes (1588–1643) ≈ mennonite leader Herman op den Graeff (1585–1642)
 Abraham Hermans op den Graeff (~1610–1656) ≈ Eva von der Leyen
 Isaac Hermans op den Graeff (1616–1679) ≈ Grietjen Peters (died 1679) 
 Abraham op den Graeff (1649–1731) -- Updegraff family 
 Adolphus op den Graeff (1653–1680) -- Updegrove family

References

External links 
 Op den Graeff Krefeld Stained-Glass Windows
 Google Bücher: Germania Topo-Chrono-Stemmato-Graphica Sacra Et Profana, von Gacriel Bucelin, Ulm 1655

Further reading 
 Bender, Harold S. (1957) Graeff, op den (Opdegraf, Updegrave, Updegrove) family. Global Anabaptist Mennonite Encyclopedia Online. Global Anabaptist Mennonite Encyclopedia Online
 Ulle, R.F. (1983) The Original Germantown Families. Mennonite Family History April.

Dutch families
American families of German ancestry